The Chattanooga Mocs college football team represents the University of Tennessee at Chattanooga as a member of the Southern Conference (SoCon). The Mocs competes as part of the NCAA Division I Football Championship Subdivision. The program has had 24 head coaches, since it began play during the 1899 season. Since December 2018, Rusty Wright has served as head coach at Chattanooga.

The Mocs have played nearly 1,100 games over 116. In that time, two coaches have led Chattanooga in postseason playoff games: Buddy Nix and Russ Huesman. Five coaches have won conference championships: Frank Thomas won three, Harold Drew won one, and Scrappy Moore one as a member of the Southern Intercollegiate Athletic Association; Moore won three as a member of the Dixie Conference, and; Joe Morrison and Russ Huesman each won three as a member of the Southern Conference.

Moore is the leader in seasons coached and games won, with 171 victories during his 37 years with the program. Thomas has the highest winning percentage of those who have coached more than one game, with 0.730. Sam McAllister has the lowest winning percentage of those who have coached more than one game, with .083. Of the 24 different head coaches who have led the Mocs, Thomas and Moore have been inducted into the College Football Hall of Fame.

Key

Coaches

Notes

References 

Chattanooga

Chattanooga Mocs head football coaches